Stade Municipal is a multi-use stadium in Porto-Novo, Benin.  It is currently used mostly for football matches and is the home ground of AS Porto Novo of the Benin Premier League.  The stadium has a capacity of 20,000 spectators.

References

External links
 Stadium information

Football venues in Benin
Buildings and structures in Porto-Novo